Sarasa Balussery is a stage actress in Kerala and a film actress in Malayalam cinema. Her films include Sudani from Nigeria (2018), Virus (2019), Thirike (2021) and Dakini (2018).

She became more popular after she was cast in Malayalam film along with Savithri Shreedharan in Sudani from Nigeria in  2018 and the movie was successful and her performance received various awards.

Personal life

Sarasa has acted for five decades on the Malayalam stage. Her association was with Kozhikode based drama theaters such as Kalinga, Sangamam, Stage Inda, Chiranthana and she performed in numerous plays. Three decades ago she was cast in the Malayalam film Uyarum Njan Nadake, which was an early Mohanlal film, as the mother role.

Filmography

TV serials 
 Swapnamoru Chakku (Flowers TV)

Awards and achievements

2019 Best Character Actress shared with Savithri Shreedharan at the 49th Kerala State Film Awards
2019 Best supporting Actress shared with Savithri Shreedharan at the 21st Asianet Film Awards

References

https://english.mathrubhumi.com/movies-music/movie-news/the-2-mothers-in-sudani-from-nigeria-are-happy-1.3608518

External links
 

Living people
Actresses from Kerala
Indian film actresses
Actresses in Malayalam cinema
20th-century Indian actresses
21st-century Indian actresses
Actresses from Kozhikode
Actresses in Malayalam television
Indian stage actresses
Actresses in Malayalam theatre
Year of birth missing (living people)